Euseius emanus is a species of mite in the family Phytoseiidae.

References

emanus
Articles created by Qbugbot
Animals described in 1979